Robichaux is a surname. Notable people with the surname include:

 Cynthia Robichaux Chenault (born 1937, stagename: Cindy Robbins), U.S. actress
 Dilana Robichaux (born 1972), full name of South African singer-songwriter Dilana
 Joe Robichaux (1900–1965), American jazz artist; nephew of John
 John Robichaux (1866–1939), American jazz artist; uncle of Joe
 Mary Robichaux, U.S. politician
 Tony Robichaux (1961–2019), American college baseball coach

See also

Robichaux House, a historic house in Thibodaux, Louisiana
 
 Robichaud
 Robicheau
 Robicheaux